A destination sectional center facility (SCF) is a processing and distribution center (P&DC) of the United States Postal Service (USPS) that serves a designated geographical area defined by one or more three-digit ZIP Code prefixes.  A sectional center facility routes mail between local post offices and to and from network distribution centers (NDCs) and Surface Transfer Centers (STCs), which form the backbone of the network.

Civil SCFs

Alabama
Note:  Alabama 369 is served by Jackson, Mississippi; 353 is unassigned.
 Birmingham (350-352, 354-359, 362), served by Birmingham–Shuttlesworth International Airport 351 24th St N, Birmingham, AL 35203
 Montgomery (360-361, 363-364, 367-368) 6701 Winton Blount Blvd, Montgomery AL 36119 
 Mobile (365-366, Mississippi 394) 4538 Shipyard Rd, Mobile AL 36675

Alaska
Anchorage (995-997):  4141 Postmark Dr., Anchorage, AK 99519, served by Ted Stevens Anchorage International Airport
Juneau (998)
Ketchikan (999)

American Samoa
American Samoa is served by the SCF in Honolulu, Hawaii.

Arizona
Note:  AZ 864 served by Las Vegas, Nevada; AZ 865 served by Albuquerque, New Mexico; 854, 858, 861, and 862 are unassigned.
Phoenix (850-853, 855, 859, 860, 863)
Tucson (856-857)

Arkansas

Note:  Arkansas 723-724 served by Memphis, Tennessee; Arkansas 718 served by Shreveport, Louisiana.
Little Rock (716-717, 719-722, 725, 728)
Northwest Arkansas (726-727, 729)

California

Note:  CA 961 is served by Reno, Nevada; CA 909 and 929 are unassigned.

Los Angeles (900-905, 907, 908) 7001 S. Central Ave., Los Angeles, CA 90052-9998
Industry (906, 917, 918) 15421 E Gale Ave., City of Industry, CA 91715-9608
Santa Clarita (910-916) 28201 Franklin Pkwy., Santa Clarita, CA 91383-9998
San Diego (919-921) 11251 Rancho Carmel Drive, San Diego, CA 92199-9998
San Bernardino (922-925) 1900 W Redlands Blvd., San Bernardino, CA 92403-9997
Santa Ana (926-927) 3101 W. Sunflower Ave., Santa Ana, CA 92799-0101
Anaheim (928) 5335 E. La Palma Ave., Anaheim, CA 92899-9002
Santa Barbara (930-931, 934) 400 Storke Road, Goleta, CA 93117
Bakersfield (932-933, 935)
Fresno (936-937, IRS 938)
San Jose (939, 950-951) 1750 Lundy Avenue, San Jose, CA 95101-9998
San Francisco (940-941, 943-944, 949, 954) 1300 Evans Ave, San Francisco, CA 94188-8014
Sacramento (942, 952-953, 956-959) 3775 Industrial Blvd., West Sacramento, CA 95799-9998
Oakland (945-948) 1675 7th St, Oakland, CA 94615
Eureka (955)
Redding (960)

Colorado
Note: Colorado 813 is served by Albuquerque, New Mexico; 817-819 are unused.
Denver (800-812) 25630 East 75th Ave., Denver CO 80249
Grand Junction (814-816)

Connecticut
Note: 066, 068, and 069 are served by Westchester, New York.
Hartford (060-065, 067, Massachusetts 010-012) 141 Weston St., Hartford, CT 06101

Delaware
Wilmington (197-199, Pennsylvania 193) 147 Quigley Blvd., New Castle, DE 19720

Washington, D.C.
Note:  Mail deposited in Washington, D.C. may be postmarked from Suburban Maryland, Southern Maryland, Washington, D.C. or the Capital District.

Washington Street and PO box addresses (200), 900 Brentwood Rd. NE, Washington DC  20066-9998
Washington US government, agencies, etc. (202-205)
Washington Parcel Return Service (569)

Florida
Note:  Florida 343, 345, and 348 are unassigned.  For 340, see Military below.
Jacksonville (320, 322, 326, 344, Georgia 313-315) 7415 Commonwealth Ave, Jacksonville, FL 32099
Orlando (321, 327-329, 347)  10401 Post Office Blvd., Orlando, FL 32862
Tallahassee (323, Georgia 316-317 & 398) 2800 S Adams St, Tallahassee, FL 32301
Pensacola (324-325) 1400 W Jordan St, Pensacola, FL 32501
Miami (330-333) 2200 NW 72nd Ave, Miami FL 33152
West Palm Beach (334, 349) 3200 Summit Blvd, West Palm Beach, FL 33416
Tampa (335, 336, 346) 1801 Grant St., Tampa, FL 33605
Manasota (337, 338, 342) 850 Tallevast Rd. Sarasota, FL. 34260
Fort Myers (339, 341) 14080 Jetport Loop, Fort Myers, FL 33913

Georgia
Note:  Georgia 307 is served by Chattanooga, Tennessee. Georgia 313-315 are served by Jacksonville, FL. Georgia 316-317, and 398 are served by Tallahassee, FL

North Metro, GA (300, 305-306) 1605 Boggs Rd, Duluth, GA 30096-1876 
Atlanta (301-303, 311, IRS 399) 3900 Crown Rd. SW, Atlanta, GA 30304
Macon (304, 310, 312, 318-319) 451 College St., Macon, GA 31213
Augusta (308-309; South Carolina 298) 525 8th St., Augusta, GA 30901

Guam

SCF Barrigada (969), served by Guam International Airport, 489 Army Dr., Barrigada, GU 96913

Hawaii

Honolulu (967-968), served by Honolulu International Airport.

Idaho
Note:  Idaho 835 and 838 are served by Spokane, Washington; Idaho 832 and 834 are served by Salt Lake City, Utah. 839 is unassigned.
Boise (833, 836-837, Oregon 979)

Illinois
Note:  Illinois 620, 622, and 628-629 are served by St. Louis, Missouri; 621 is unassigned.
Palatine (600, 602, 610-611) 1300 Northwest Hwy., Palatine, IL 60095
Carol Stream (601, 603) 550 E Fullerton Ave, Carol Stream, IL 60188
South Suburban (604) 6801 W 73rd St, Bedford Park, IL 60499
Fox Valley (605) 3900 Gabrielle Ln, Aurora, IL 60599
Chicago (606-608) 433 W Harrison St, Chicago, IL 60699
Champaign (609, 617-619, 624) 2001 N Mattis Ave, Champaign, IL 61821
Quad Cities (612; Iowa 526-528) 
Peoria (613-616) 95 State St, Peoria, IL 61601
Springfield (623, 625-627) 2105 E Cook St, Springfield, IL 62703

Indiana
Note:  Indiana 470 is served by Cincinnati, Ohio; Indiana 471 is served by Louisville, Kentucky.

Indianapolis (460-462, 469, 472, 474, 478-479)
Gary (463-464)
South Bend (465-466)
Fort Wayne (467-468)
Muncie (473)
Evansville (475-477, Kentucky 420, 423-424); 800 Sycamore St., Evansville, IN 47708-9998

Iowa
Note:  Iowa 510-513 are served by Sioux Falls, South Dakota; Iowa 515-516 are served by Omaha, Nebraska; Iowa 526-528 are served by Quad Cities, Illinois; 517-519 and 529 are unassigned.

Des Moines (500-503, 505, 508-509, 514, 525)
Waterloo (504, 506-507, 521)
Cedar Rapids (520, 522-524)

Kansas
Note:  660-662 and 664-668 are served by Kansas City, Missouri; 677 is served by North Platte, Nebraska; 679 is served by Amarillo, Texas; 663 is unassigned.

Wichita (669-676, 678)

Kentucky
Note:  Kentucky 407-409, 417, 418, 425, and 426 are served by Knoxville, Tennessee; Kentucky 410 is served by Cincinnati, Ohio; Kentucky 411, 412, 415, and 416 are served by Charleston, West Virginia; Kentucky 421 and 422 are served by Nashville, Tennessee; Kentucky 420, 423 and 424 are served by Evansville, Indiana; 419, 428, and 429 are unassigned.
Louisville (400-402, 427, Indiana 471) 1420 Gardiner Ln, Louisville KY 40231
Lexington (403-406, 413-414) 1088 Nandino Blvd, Lexington KY 40511

Louisiana
Note:  Louisiana 702, 709 and 715 are unassigned.
New Orleans (700-701, 703-704)
Lafayette (705-706)
Baton Rouge (707-708)
Shreveport (710-714, Arkansas 718, Texas 755, 756, and 759)

Maine
Southern Maine (039-043, 045, 048) 125 Forest Ave., Portland, ME 04101
Eastern Maine (044, 046, 047, 049) 16 Penobscot Meadow Dr., Hampden, ME 04444

Maryland
Note: 213 is unassigned.
Southern Maryland (206-207), 9201 Edgeworth Dr., Capitol Heights MD 20790-9998
Suburban Maryland (208-209), 16501 Shady Grove Rd., Gaithersburg MD 20898-9998
Linthicum (210-211, 214), 961 Corporate Blvd., Linthicum Heights, MD 21090-2225
Baltimore (212, 215, 217, 219, West Virginia 267), 900 E. Fayette St., Baltimore, MD 21233-9715
Eastern Shore (216, 218), 29060 Airpark Dr., Easton, MD 21601-9997

Massachusetts
Note:  Massachusetts 010-012 are served by Hartford, Connecticut; Massachusetts 025-027 are served by Providence, Rhode Island.
Central Massachusetts (013-017) 192 Main St., Shrewsbury, MA 01546
Middlesex-Essex (018-019, IRS 055) 76 Main St., North Reading, MA 01889
Brockton (020, 023) 225 Liberty St., Brockton, MA 02301
Boston (021-022, 024) 25 Dorchester Ave., Boston, MA 02205

Michigan
Metroplex (480, 483-487) 711 North Glenwood Avenue, Pontiac, MI 48340
Detroit (481-482, 492, Ohio 434-436): 1401 West Fort Street #1006, Detroit, MI 48233-1001
Lansing (488-489)
Grand Rapids (490-491, 493-495) 
Traverse City (496-497)
Iron Mountain (498-499)

Minnesota
Note: 552 is unassigned. 565 is served by Fargo, ND. 567 is served by Grand Forks, ND
St. Paul (550-551, 556-559, Wisconsin 540 and 546)
Minneapolis (553-555)
Mankato (560-561)
St. Cloud (562-564)
Bemidji (566)

Mississippi
Note:  Mississippi 386 and 388 are served by Memphis, Tennessee. Mississippi 394 is served by Mobile, Alabama.
Jackson (387, 389-393, 396, 397, Alabama 369) 401 E South St, Jackson MS 39201
Gulfport (395) 10285 Corporate Dr, Gulfport MS 39503

Missouri
Note:  Missouri 632, 642-643, and 659 are unassigned.

St. Louis (630-631, 633-634, 636-639; Illinois 620, 622, 628-629) 1720 Market St., St. Louis, MO 63155
Mid-Missouri (635, 650-653)
Kansas City (640-641, 644-647, IRS 649; Kansas 660-662 & 664-668)
Springfield (648, 654-658)

Montana
Billings (590-593, 597, Wyoming 821)

Great Falls (594-596)

Missoula (598-599)

Nebraska
Note:  682 and 694-699 are unassigned.
Omaha (680-681, 683-689, Iowa 515-516)
North Platte (690-693; Kansas 677)

Nevada
Note:  Nevada 892, 896, and 899 are unassigned. Nevada 898 is served by Salt Lake City, UT
Las Vegas (889-891, 893, Arizona 864)
Reno (894-895, 897, California 961)

New Hampshire
Note:  New Hampshire 035-037 are served by White River Junction, Vermont.
Manchester (030-034, 038) 955 Goffs Falls Rd., Manchester, NH 03103

New Jersey

Dominick V. Daniels (070-073, 079, 088, 089) 850 Newark-Jersey City Turnpike, Kearny, NJ
Northern New Jersey Metro (074-076, 078) 200 Industrial Ave, Teterboro, NJ
Trenton (077, 085-087) 680 US-130, Trenton, NJ 08650
South Jersey (080-084) 421 Benigno Blvd., Bellmawr, NJ 08031

New Mexico
Note: 880 and 883 are served by El Paso, Texas; 881 and 882 are served by Lubbock, Texas; 885 is assigned out of order to El Paso, Texas;  872, 876, and 886-888 are unassigned.
Albuquerque (870-871, 873-875, 877-879, 884, Colorado 813, Arizona 865)

New York
Note: New York 06390 is served by Hartford, Connecticut.
New York (100-102 Manhattan; 104 The Bronx) Morgan General Mail Facility, 341 Ninth Avenue, New York, NY 10199
Brooklyn (103 Staten Island; 112 Brooklyn; 116 Far Rockaway) 1050 Forbell Street #2005, Brooklyn, NY 11256
Westchester (105-109; Connecticut 066, 068, 069) 1000 Westchester Avenue, White Plains, NY 10610
Queens (111 Long Island City; 113 Flushing; 114 Jamaica) 142-02 20th Avenue, College Point, NY 11356
Western Nassau (110, 115) 830 Stewart Avenue, Garden City
Mid-Island (117-119, IRS 005) 160 Duryea Road, Melville
Albany (120-123, 128-129), 30 Old Karner Road, Albany
Albany (Mid-Hudson) (124-127)
Syracuse (130-139), 5640 E. Taft Road, Syracuse
Buffalo (140-143, 147), 1200 William Street, Buffalo
Rochester (144-146, 148, 149, Pennsylvania 167), 1335 Jefferson Road, Rochester

North Carolina
Note: North Carolina 287-289 are served by Greenville, South Carolina.
Greensboro (270-274, 286) 1120 Pleasant Ridge Rd., Greensboro, NC 27498
Raleigh (275-277) 1 Floretta Pl., Raleigh, NC 27676
Rocky Mount (278-279) 201 S. George St., Rocky Mount, NC 27801
Charlotte (280-282, South Carolina 297) 2901 Scott Futrell Dr., Charlotte, NC 28228
Fayetteville (283-285) 301 Green St., Fayetteville, NC 28301

North Dakota
Note: North Dakota 589 is unassigned.
Fargo (580-581, 584, Minnesota 565)
Grand Forks (582-583, Minnesota 567)
Bismarck (585-588, South Dakota 576)

Northern Mariana Islands
See Guam above.

Ohio
Note:  Ohio 434-436 is served by Detroit, Michigan;  Ohio 439 is served by Pittsburgh, Pennsylvania.
Columbus (430-433, 437-438, 456-458)
Cleveland (440, 441, 444, 445, 448, 449)
Akron (442-443, 446-447)
Cincinnati (450-452, IRS 459, Kentucky 410, Indiana 470)
Dayton (453-455)

Oklahoma
Note:  Oklahoma 739 is served by Amarillo, Texas; 732 and 742 are unassigned; 733 is assigned to Austin, Texas.
Oklahoma City (730-731, 734-738, 748) 4025 W Reno Ave., Oklahoma City, OK 73147-9805
Tulsa (740-741, 743-747, 749)

Oregon
Note:  Oregon 979 is served by Boise, Idaho.
Portland (970-973, 977-978, Washington 986) 7007 NE Cornfoot Rd., Portland, OR 97218-9300
Eugene (974) 3148 Gateway St, Springfield, OR 97477-1100
Medford (975-976) 173 Ehrman Way, Medford, OR 97501-1335

Palau

See Guam above.

Pennsylvania
Note: Pennsylvania 193 is served by Wilmington, Delaware. Pennsylvania 167 is served by Rochester, NY. 192 is assigned to the IRS.

Pittsburgh (150-154, 156, 160-165, West Virginia 260 and 265, Ohio 439) 1001 California Ave, Pittsburgh, PA 15290
Johnstown (155, 157-159, 166, 168) 235 Jari Dr., Johnstown, PA 15904
Harrisburg (169-179, 195-196, West Virginia 254) 1425 Crooked Hill Rd., Harrisburg, PA 17107
Lehigh Valley (180-188) 2299 Highland Ave., Lehigh Valley, PA 18002
Philadelphia (189-192, 194) 7500 Lindbergh Blvd., Philadelphia, PA 19176

Puerto Rico

San Juan (006-007, 009, United States Virgin Islands 008) 585 Ave FD Roosevelt Ste 370, San Juan, PR 00936-9312

Rhode Island

Providence (028-029, Massachusetts 025-027) 24 Corliss St., Providence, RI 02904

South Carolina
Note:  South Carolina 297 is served by Charlotte, North Carolina; South Carolina 298 is served by Augusta, Georgia
Columbia (290-292, 295) 2001 Dixiana Rd., West Columbia, SC 29172
Charleston (294, 299)
Greenville (293, 296, North Carolina 287-289) 204 Fairforest Way, Greenville, SC 29607

South DakotaNote:  South Dakota 578 and 579 are unassigned. South Dakota 576 is served by Bismarck, ND.Sioux Falls (570-571, Iowa 510-513)
Dakota Central (572-575) 355 15th St NW, Huron, SD 57399-9998 
Rapid City (577)

Tennessee

Nashville (370-372, 384, 385, Kentucky 421 and 422) 525 Royal Pkwy. Rm 9997, Nashville, TN 37230
Chattanooga (373-374, Georgia 307) 6050 Shallowford Rd., Chattanooga, TN 37421
Knoxville (376-379, Kentucky 407-409, 417-418, 425-426, Virginia 242) 1237 E. Weisgarber Rd., Knoxville, TN 37950
Memphis (IRS 375, 380-383, Mississippi 386 and 388, Arkansas 723, 724) 638 S. 2nd St., Memphis, TN 38101

TexasNote:  Texas 755, 756, and 759 are served by Shreveport, Louisiana; Texas 771 is unassigned.Austin (IRS 733, 765, 786-787, 789) — 8225 Cross Park Dr, Austin, TX 78710
North Texas (750, 754, 757-758) — 951 W. Bethel Rd., Coppell, TX 75099
Dallas (751-753)
North Houston (770, 772-778) — 4600 Aldine Bender Rd., Houston, TX 77315
Fort Worth (760-764, 766-767) — 4600 Mark IV Pkwy, Fort Worth, TX 76161
Abilene (768-769, 795-796)
Corpus Christi (779, 783-784)
San Antonio (780-782, 788) — 10410 Perrin Beitel Rd., San Antonio, TX 78284
McAllen (785)
Amarillo (790-792, Kansas 679, Oklahoma 739)
Lubbock (793-794, New Mexico 881-882)
Midland (797)
El Paso (798-799, 885, New Mexico 880, 883)

UtahNote:  842 is assigned to the IRS. Utah 848 and 849 are unassigned.Salt Lake City (840-844, Idaho 832 & 834,  Wyoming 829-831, Nevada 898)
Provo (845-847)

VermontNote:  055 is assigned to Middlesex-Essex, Massachusetts.White River Junction (050-053, 057-059, New Hampshire 035-037) 195 Sykes Mountain Ave., White River Junction, VT 05001
Burlington (054, 056) 8 New England Dr., Essex Jct, VT, 05452

United States Virgin IslandsSee Puerto Rico above.VirginiaNote:  Virginia 242 is served by Knoxville, Tennessee; Virginia 246 is served by Charleston, WV.Dulles (201, 226, 227, West Virginia 268) 44715 Prentice Dr., Sterling, VA 20101
Northern Virginia (220-223) 8409 Lee Hwy., Merrifield, VA 22081
Richmond (224-225, 228-232, 238-239, 244) 5801 Technology Blvd, Sandston, VA 23150
Norfolk (233-237) 600 Church St, Norfolk, VA 23501-9908 
Roanoke (240-241, 243, 245) 419 Rutherford Ave. NE, Roanoke, VA 24022

WashingtonNote:  Washington 986 is served by Portland, Oregon.  987 is unassigned.Seattle (980-982) 10700 27th Ave S, Tukwila, WA 98168
Tacoma (983-985) 4001 S Pine St, Tacoma, WA 98413-9994
Wenatchee (988) 3075 Ohme Rd, Wenatchee, WA 98801-9997
Yakima (989) 205 W Washington Ave; Yakima, WA 98903-9998
Spokane (990-994, Idaho 835, 838) 2928 S Spotted Rd, Spokane, WA 99224

West VirginiaNote:  West Virginia 254 is served by Harrisburg, Pennsylvania; West Virginia 267 is served by Baltimore, Maryland; West Virginia 260 and 265 are served by Pittsburgh, Pennsylvania; West Virginia 268 is served by Dulles, Virginia; 269 was deleted in 1965.Charleston (247-253, 255-259, 261-264, 266; Virginia 246; Kentucky 411, 412, 415, 416) 1000 Centre Way, Charleston, WV 25309

WisconsinNote:  Wisconsin 540 & 546 are served by St. Paul, Minnesota. 533 & 536 are unassigned.Milwaukee (530-532, 534, 549)
Madison (535, 537-539) 3902 Milwaukee St., Madison, WI 53714
Green Bay (541-545)
Eau Claire (547-548)

WyomingNote:  Wyoming 821 is served by Billings, Montana. Wyoming 829-831 are served by Salt Lake City, Utah.Cheyenne (820, 822-823)
Casper (824-828)

Military SCFs
The Military Postal Service Agency (MPSA) takes control of the mail at New York, Miami, or San Francisco and then routes it to its intended destination.Note: for military postal purposes Canada, Africa, and the Middle East are in Europe.Armed Forces AmericasArmed Forces Americas is served by SCF Miami FL 331 Latin America and the Caribbean (340)

Armed Forces EuropeNote:  Armed Forces Europe is served by SCF New York NY 100. Germany (090-092)
 Contingency (093)
 United Kingdom (094)
 Ships (095)
 Italy and Spain (096)
 Other Europe (097)
 Middle East/Africa (098-099)

Armed Forces PacificArmed Forces Pacific is served by SCF San Francisco CA 940''
 Korea (962)
 Japan (963)
 Philippines (964)
 Other Pacific (965)
 Ships (966)

References

Sources
[https://fast.usps.com/fast/fastApp/resources/labelListFilesSearch.action
L002 3-Digit ZIP Code Prefix Matrix, Effective Date 2017-04-01, from USPS Facility Access and Shipment Tracking (FAST)
L005 3-Digit ZIP Code Prefix Groups—SCF Sortation, Effective Date 2017-04-01, from USPS Facilities Access and Shipment Tracking (FAST)
G030 Postal Zones
G042 Pricing and Classification Service Center
[USPS Destination Delivery Unit (DDU) List - Capital Metro Area]
USPS Destination Delivery Unit (DDU) List - Eastern Area
USPS Destination Delivery Unit (DDU) List - Great Lakes Area
USPS Destination Delivery Unit (DDU) List - New York Metro Area
USPS Destination Delivery Unit (DDU) List - Northeast Area
USPS Destination Delivery Unit (DDU) List - Pacific Area
USPS Destination Delivery Unit (DDU) List - Southeast Area
USPS Destination Delivery Unit (DDU) List - Southwest Area
USPS Destination Delivery Unit (DDU) List - Western Area
5 FAH-10 H-413 ADDRESS FORMATS FOR APO/FPO POSTS

External links 
 United States Postal Service
 Military Postal Service Agency

United States Postal Service